Pascal Auscher is a French mathematician working at University of Paris-Sud. Specializing in harmonic analysis and operator theory, he is mostly known for, together with Steve Hofmann, Michael Lacey, Alan McIntosh and Philippe Tchamitchian, solving the famous Kato's conjecture.

References

External links 
 

Living people
Year of birth missing (living people)
21st-century French mathematicians